Spider-Man: No Way Home is a 2021 American superhero film based on the Marvel Comics character Spider-Man, co-produced by Columbia Pictures and Marvel Studios and distributed by Sony Pictures Releasing. It is the sequel to Spider-Man: Homecoming (2017) and Spider-Man: Far From Home (2019), and the 27th film in the Marvel Cinematic Universe (MCU). The film was directed by Jon Watts and written by Chris McKenna and Erik Sommers. It stars Tom Holland as Peter Parker / Spider-Man alongside Zendaya, Benedict Cumberbatch, Jacob Batalon, Jon Favreau, Jamie Foxx, Willem Dafoe, Alfred Molina, Benedict Wong, Tony Revolori, Marisa Tomei, Andrew Garfield, and Tobey Maguire. In the film, Parker asks Dr. Stephen Strange (Cumberbatch) to use magic to make his identity as Spider-Man a secret again following its public revelation at the end of Far From Home. When the spell goes wrong because of Parker's actions, the multiverse is broken open, which allows visitors from alternate realities to enter Parker's universe.

A third MCU Spider-Man film was planned during the production of Homecoming in 2017. Negotiations between Sony and Marvel Studios to alter their deal—in which they produce the Spider-Man films together—ended with Marvel Studios leaving the project in August 2019, but a negative fan reaction led to a new deal between the companies a month later. Watts, McKenna, Sommers, and Holland were set to return, and filming took place from October 2020 to March 2021 in New York City and Atlanta. No Way Home features several actors reprising their roles from non-MCU Spider-Man films directed by Sam Raimi and Marc Webb, including previous Spider-Man actors Maguire and Garfield. The involvement of both actors was the subject of wide speculation and numerous leaks despite the efforts of Sony, Marvel, and the cast to conceal their involvement.

Spider-Man: No Way Home premiered at the Fox Village Theatre in Los Angeles on December 13, 2021, and was theatrically released in the United States on December 17, as part of Phase Four of the MCU. It received praise from critics for the story, direction, action sequences, emotional weight, performances (particularly those of Holland, Dafoe, Molina, Tomei, Garfield, and Maguire), and the cast's chemistry. The film grossed over $1.9 billion worldwide, surpassing its predecessor as the highest-grossing film released by Sony Pictures. It became the highest-grossing film of 2021, the sixth-highest-grossing film of all time, the highest grossing Spider-Man film, and set several other box office records, including those for films released during the COVID-19 pandemic. The film received a nomination for Best Visual Effects at the 94th Academy Awards, among numerous other accolades. An extended version of the film, subtitled The More Fun Stuff Version, was theatrically released globally in September 2022. A sequel is in development.

Plot 

After Quentin Beck frames Peter Parker for his murder and reveals Parker's identity as Spider-Man, Parker, his girlfriend Michelle "MJ" Jones-Watson, best friend Ned Leeds, and aunt May are interrogated by the Department of Damage Control. Lawyer Matt Murdock gets Parker's charges dropped, but the group grapples with negative publicity. After Parker, MJ, and Ned's MIT applications are rejected, Parker goes to the New York Sanctum to ask Stephen Strange for help. Strange starts casting a spell that would make everyone forget Parker is Spider-Man, but it is corrupted when Parker repeatedly requests alterations to let his loved ones retain their memories, ultimately causing Strange to contain the spell to stop it.

At Strange's suggestion, Parker tries to convince an MIT administrator to reconsider the applications of MJ and Ned, but is attacked by Otto Octavius. Octavius rips nanotechnology from Parker's Iron Spider suit, which bonds with his mechanical tentacles and allows Parker to control them. As Norman Osborn arrives and attacks, Strange teleports Parker back to the Sanctum and locks Octavius in a cell next to Curt Connors. Strange explains that the corrupted spell summoned people from other universes within the multiverse who know Spider-Man's identity. He orders Parker, MJ, and Ned to find and capture them; they locate and retrieve Max Dillon and Flint Marko at a military research facility.

Osborn reclaims control of himself from his split Green Goblin personality and destroys the Goblin mask. He goes to a F.E.A.S.T. building, where May comforts him before Parker retrieves him. While discussing their battles with Spider-Man, Osborn, Octavius, and Dillon realize they were pulled from their universes just before their deaths. Strange prepares to reverse the contained spell and send the villains back to their respective universes, but Parker argues that they should first cure the villains of the insanity that would lead to their deaths, to possibly change their fates upon their return. When Strange refuses, Parker steals the spell, traps Strange in the Mirror Dimension, and, with May, takes the villains to Happy Hogan's apartment, where he uses Stark Industries technology to cure Octavius. Before Parker can cure anyone else, his spider-sense goes off. He then realizes that the Goblin persona has retaken control of Osborn, who convinces the uncured villains to betray Parker. As Dillon, Marko, and Connors escape, the Goblin fatally injures May. Before she dies, May tells Parker that "with great power, there must also come great responsibility".

Ned discovers that he can create portals using Strange's sling ring, which he and MJ use to try to locate Parker. They instead find alternate versions of Parker from the villains' universes who were also summoned by Strange's spell and who are nicknamed "Peter-Two" and "Peter-Three". The group finds this universe's Parker, nicknamed "Peter-One", who is ready to give up and send the villains home to die. The alternate Parkers share stories of losing loved ones and encourage Peter-One to fight in May's honor, and the three Parkers develop cures for the villains.

The group lure Dillon, Marko, and Connors to the Statue of Liberty. Peter-One and Peter-Two cure Connors and Marko, while Octavius arrives to help cure Dillon, and Ned frees Strange from the Mirror Dimension. The Goblin appears and unleashes the contained spell, which breaks apart the barriers between universes, pulling in countless others who know Parker's identity. Strange attempts to hold them off while an enraged Peter-One tries to kill the Goblin. Peter-Two stops him, but gets stabbed by the Goblin. Peter-Three helps Peter-One inject the Goblin with his cure, restoring Osborn's sanity. Peter-One realizes that the only way to protect the multiverse is to erase Peter Parker from everyone's memory and requests Strange to do so while promising MJ and Ned that he will find them again. Strange reluctantly casts the spell, and everyone returns to their respective universes—including Eddie Brock, who unknowingly leaves behind a piece of the Venom symbiote.

Two weeks later, Parker visits MJ to reintroduce himself, but he decides against it. While mourning at May's grave, he has a conversation with Hogan and is inspired to carry on, making a new suit.

Cast 

 Tom Holland as Peter Parker / Spider-Man:A teenager and Avenger who received spider-like abilities after being bitten by a radioactive spider. The film explores the fallout of Spider-Man: Far From Homes (2019) mid-credits scene, in which Parker's identity as Spider-Man is exposed, and Parker is more pessimistic in contrast to previous Marvel Cinematic Universe (MCU) films. Holland said Parker feels defeated and insecure and was excited to explore the darker side of the character. The adjustment back to portraying Parker, including raising his voice pitch and returning to the mindset of a "naïve, charming teenager", was strange for Holland after taking on more mature roles such as in Cherry (2021). 
 Zendaya as Michelle "MJ" Jones-Watson:Parker's classmate and girlfriend. The character's full name is revealed in the film, having previously just been known as Michelle Jones, bringing her closer to the comics counterpart Mary Jane Watson.
 Benedict Cumberbatch as Dr. Stephen Strange:A neurosurgeon who became a Master of the Mystic Arts following a career-ending car accident. Holland felt Strange was not a mentor to Parker, unlike Robert Downey Jr.'s Tony Stark in Spider-Man: Homecoming (2017), but instead saw them as colleagues and noted their relationship breaks down throughout the course of the film. Cumberbatch felt there was a close relationship between Strange and Parker because both are neighborhood superheroes with a shared history. Co-writer Chris McKenna described Strange as the voice of reason in the film.
 Jacob Batalon as Ned Leeds: Parker's best friend. Batalon lost  for his role in this film.
 Jon Favreau as Happy Hogan: The head of security for Stark Industries and former driver and bodyguard of Tony Stark, who looks after Parker.
 Jamie Foxx as Max Dillon / Electro:An Oscorp electrical engineer from an alternate reality who gained electric powers after an accident involving genetically modified electric eels. Foxx reprises his role from Marc Webb's The Amazing Spider-Man 2 (2014). The character was redesigned for No Way Home, foregoing his original blue Ultimate Marvel-based design in favor of a yellow one more similar to his mainstream comic book appearance.
 Willem Dafoe as Norman Osborn / Green Goblin:A scientist and the CEO of Oscorp from an alternate reality who tested an unstable strength enhancer on himself. He developed an insane split personality as a result and uses advanced Oscorp armor and equipment. Dafoe reprises his role from Sam Raimi's Spider-Man trilogy. Dafoe felt Green Goblin had advanced from his portrayal in Spider-Man (2002) and had "a few more tricks up [his] sleeves" in this film. Dafoe was digitally de-aged for the role, and the character also obtains upgrades to his costume to make him more closely resemble his comic book counterpart.
 Alfred Molina as Otto Octavius / Doctor Octopus:A scientist from an alternate reality with four artificially intelligent mechanical tentacles fused to his body after an accident. Molina reprises his role from Raimi's Spider-Man 2 (2004), with this film continuing from the character's story prior to his death in that film. Molina was surprised by this approach because he had aged in the years since he made that film; digital de-aging was also used to make him look physically the same as in Spider-Man 2. The mechanical tentacles were created completely through CGI, rather than blending it with puppetry as in Spider-Man 2.
 Benedict Wong as Wong: Strange's mentor and friend who became the new Sorcerer Supreme during Strange's absence in the Blip.
 Tony Revolori as Eugene "Flash" Thompson: Parker's classmate and former rival.
 Marisa Tomei as May Parker:Parker's aunt. While developing the story, the writers realized that May would play a role similar to Uncle Ben's role in other incarnations of Spider-Man. As such, the thematic and often-paraphrasingly-quoted phrase "with great power, there must also come great responsibility" is said by May, since she has been the "moral guide" for Parker in the MCU. 
 Andrew Garfield as Peter Parker / Spider-Man:An alternate version of Parker who is haunted by his failure to save his deceased girlfriend, Gwen Stacy. Garfield reprises his role from Webb's The Amazing Spider-Man films. The other Spider-Men refer to him as "Peter-Three", while Marvel's official website named him "The Amazing Spider-Man". Garfield embraced his role as the middle brother of the group and was interested in exploring the idea of a tortured Parker following the events of The Amazing Spider-Man 2, including how lessons from those events could be passed to Holland's character. He was grateful for the chance to "tie up some loose ends" for his incarnation of Parker, and described working with Holland and Maguire as an opportunity to have "deeper conversations... about our experiences with the character". Parker ends up saving MJ during the climax in a similar way to how he fails to save Stacy in The Amazing Spider-Man 2; McKenna and co-writer Erik Sommers credited director Jon Watts for coming up with the idea while they watched a pre-visualization reel showcasing ideas for the climactic battle.
 Tobey Maguire as Peter Parker / Spider-Man:An alternate version of Parker who utilizes organic webbing instead of web shooters like his alternate counterparts. Maguire reprises his role from Raimi's Spider-Man trilogy. The other Spider-Men refer to him as "Peter-Two", while Marvel's official website named him the "Friendly Neighborhood Spider-Man". Maguire wanted the film to reveal only minimal details about what happened to his character after the events of Spider-Man 3 (2007).

Rhys Ifans reprises his role as Dr. Curt Connors / Lizard, an Oscorp scientist from Webb's The Amazing Spider-Man (2012) who transformed into a large reptilian monster while trying to regrow his missing arm. Thomas Haden Church reprises his role as Flint Marko / Sandman, a small-time thief from Raimi's Spider-Man 3 who received an ability to transform into sand. Both Ifans and Church returned to voice the characters, though footage at the end of the film when they revert to their human forms was archival footage from The Amazing Spider-Man and Spider-Man 3, respectively. Watts served as a stand-in for Church on-set by providing motion-capture reference to the uncredited body double who physically replaced Church in the role. Charlie Cox reprises his role as Matt Murdock from Marvel Television's Netflix series, and Tom Hardy reprises his roles as Eddie Brock / Venom from Sony's Spider-Man Universe (SSU) in an uncredited cameo appearance in the mid-credits scene.

Reprising their roles from previous MCU Spider-Man films are Angourie Rice as Betty Brant, Parker's classmate and Ned's ex-girlfriend; Hannibal Buress as Coach Wilson, Midtown School of Science and Technology's gym teacher; Martin Starr as Roger Harrington, Parker's academic decathlon teacher; J. B. Smoove as Julius Dell, Parker's teacher; J. K. Simmons as J. Jonah Jameson, the host of The Daily Bugle; and Gary Weeks as Department of Damage Control (DODC) agent Foster. Jake Gyllenhaal appears as Quentin Beck / Mysterio via archive footage from Far From Home. Also appearing in the film are Paula Newsome as an MIT administrator, Arian Moayed as DODC agent Cleary, Mary Rivera as Ned's grandmother, and Cristo Fernández as a bartender serving Brock. Holland's brother Harry was set to make a cameo as a thief, but his scenes were cut from the original theatrical release. Lexi Rabe, who portrayed Stark's daughter Morgan in Avengers: Endgame (2019), also had an appearance that was not included in the theatrical release.

Production

Development 
During production on Spider-Man: Homecoming (2017), two sequels were being planned by Marvel Studios and Sony Pictures. In June 2017, star Tom Holland explained that each film would take place during a different year of high school for Peter Parker / Spider-Man, with the third being set during the character's senior year. Marvel Studios President Kevin Feige noted in July 2019 that the third film would feature "a Peter Parker story that has never been done before on film" due to the ending of the second film, Spider-Man: Far From Home (2019), which publicly reveals that Parker is Spider-Man.

Development on third and fourth MCU Spider-Man films had begun by August 2019, with Sony hoping Holland and director Jon Watts would return for both; Holland was contracted to return for one more film, while Watts had completed his two-film deal and would need to sign on for any more films. By then, Marvel Studios and its parent company The Walt Disney Studios had spent several months discussing expanding their deal with Sony. The existing deal had Marvel and Feige produce the Spider-Man films for Sony and receive 5% of their revenue. Sony wanted to expand the deal to include more films while keeping the same terms of the original agreement. Disney expressed concern with Feige's workload producing the Marvel Cinematic Universe (MCU) franchise already and asked for a 25–50% stake in any future films Feige produced for Sony. Unable to come to an agreement, Sony announced that it would be moving forward on the next Spider-Man film without Feige or Marvel's involvement. Their statement acknowledged that this could change in the future, thanked Feige for his work on the first two films, and said they appreciated "the path [Feige] has helped put us on, which we will continue." Chris McKenna and Erik Sommers were writing the screenplay for the third film by the time of Sony's announcement, after also doing so for Far From Home, but Watts was receiving offers to direct large films for other studios instead of returning to the franchise, including potentially working on a different property for Marvel Studios and Feige.

In September 2019, Sony Pictures Entertainment chairman Tony Vinciquerra said that "for the moment the door is closed" on Spider-Man returning to the MCU, and confirmed that the character would be integrated with Sony's own shared universe—Sony's Spider-Man Universe (SSU)—moving forward. Responding to backlash from fans following the announcement, Vinciquerra added that "the Marvel people are terrific people, we have great respect for them, but on the other hand we have some pretty terrific people of our own. [Feige] didn't do all the work ... we're pretty capable of doing what we have to do here." However, after this fan reaction continued at Disney's biennial convention D23, and at the urging of Holland who personally spoke to Disney CEO Bob Iger and Sony Pictures Motion Picture Group chairman Tom Rothman, the companies returned to negotiations. Sony and Disney announced a new agreement at the end of September which would allow Marvel Studios and Feige to produce another MCU Spider-Man film for Sony with Amy Pascal, scheduled for July 16, 2021. Disney was reportedly co-financing 25% of the film in exchange for 25% of its profits, while retaining the character's merchandising rights. Feige said he was "thrilled" that the character would remain in the MCU and said "all of us at Marvel Studios are very excited that we get to keep working" on the franchise. The agreement also allowed Holland's Spider-Man to appear in a future Marvel Studios film as well as crossing over to Sony's own shared universe, with the latter interaction described as "a 'call and answer' between the two franchises as they acknowledge details between the two in what would loosely be described as a shared detailed universe". Sony described their previous films with Marvel Studios as a "great collaboration", and said "our mutual desire to continue was equal to that of the many fans." At the time of the new agreement, Watts was in final negotiations to direct the film.

Discussing the new deal in October, Iger attributed it to the efforts of Holland as well as the fan response to the end of the original deal. He felt that both Sony and Disney had initially forgotten that "there are other people who actually matter" while they were negotiating. Rothman said the deal was a "win-win-win. A win for Sony, a win for Disney, a win for the fans." He felt the initial reports on the negotiations did not necessarily line up with the actual discussions that were taking place, and said the final deal would have eventuated without the reports and fan discourse. Zendaya was confirmed to be reprising her role as MJ from the previous films in the sequel.

Pre-production 
McKenna and Sommers began working on the script in earnest by December 2019. They considered featuring Kraven the Hunter as the film's main antagonist, an idea that Watts had expressed interest in and pitched to Holland, before gravitating towards a story idea similar to It's a Wonderful Life (1946) in which Parker makes a wish regarding his now public identity. That idea introduced Dr. Stephen Strange to the story, and the duo began exploring the idea of the multiverse and potentially revisiting characters from past Spider-Man films. Initially they thought this would just be a tease for fans but they ultimately decided to fully integrate the past characters into the plot. Sommers said, "Once it was collectively decided that we were going to take this swing, we had to commit and we had to do what was right for the story." They optimistically wrote for all the characters they wanted in the film before those actors were confirmed to be returning. Initial drafts of the film included every major character from past Spider-Man films returning, but this was narrowed down because the pair felt they had "bit[ten] off more than [they] could chew". The duo worked hard to prevent the film from just being "a bunch of fan service" by using the returning characters to help tell Peter Parker's story instead of just creating "curtain calls for everybody". Norman Osborn / Green Goblin from Sam Raimi's Spider-Man trilogy was not the main villain of the film in the first version of the script, despite still appearing as an antagonist; after the film lost "other characters", McKenna and Sommers concluded that the Green Goblin "had to be" the main villain and rewrote the script to give him a second chance to replicate his actions in Spider-Man (2002), but in a darker way related to Holland's version of Spider-Man. America Chavez had been considered to appear in the film at one point to serve in the sorcerer's apprentice-type role that eventually became part of Ned Leeds's role in the film; she would go on to appear in Doctor Strange in the Multiverse of Madness (2022).

By the end of 2019, filming was expected to begin in mid-2020. In April 2020, Sony rescheduled No Way Homes release to November 5, 2021, due to the COVID-19 pandemic. Although the film was originally meant to be set after the events of Multiverse of Madness, release date changes meant No Way Home would be released first which meant aspects of the plot had to be rewritten, including Strange no longer having firsthand knowledge of the multiverse. McKenna felt this made it "even more frightening, to start fooling around with these things, because it's the fear of the unknown". In June, Marisa Tomei confirmed that she would return as May Parker along with Watts as director. She was hopeful that May's work as a community organizer would be featured in the film. Also in June, Charlie Cox, who portrayed Matt Murdock / Daredevil in Marvel Television's Netflix series, was contacted by Feige about reprising his role in upcoming Marvel Studios projects starting with appearances in No Way Home and the Disney+ series She-Hulk: Attorney at Law. The next month, Holland said production was planned to take place from late 2020 to February 2021, and Sony shifted the film's release date to December 17, 2021. Tony Revolori was also confirmed to be reprising his role as Flash Thompson. In early October, Jacob Batalon and Benedict Cumberbatch were set to reprise their MCU roles of Ned Leeds and Strange, while Jamie Foxx was set to return as Max Dillon / Electro from Marc Webb's The Amazing Spider-Man 2 (2014), with filming beginning later in the month. Immediately prior to the beginning of filming, several other key actors in the film had yet to sign on. According to Holland, the film needed "all or none" of the actors in order to be produced.

Filming 
Second unit filming occurred from October 14 to 16, 2020, in New York City, under the working title Serenity Now, to capture visual effects plates and establishing shots. Filming occurred in the Astoria, Sunnyside, and Long Island City neighborhoods in Queens. On October 23, filming occurred in Greenwich Village in Manhattan.

The production moved to Atlanta by October 25, with Holland, Batalon, and Zendaya joining for principal photography, after Holland finished shooting Sony's Uncharted (2022) two days earlier. Mauro Fiore served as cinematographer on the film, replacing Seamus McGarvey, who had to leave the production after contracting COVID-19. McGarvey also had a conflict with the film Cyrano (2021) following No Way Home pandemic-caused production delay, as principal photography was originally planned to start in July 2020. Shooting in Atlanta occurred at Trilith Studios, with strict safety measures in place on the soundstages to prevent exposure to COVID-19. To reduce interactions between cast and crew members on set during the pandemic, the production reportedly relied on "innovative new technology" that scanned actors into a visual effects system that can apply make-up and costumes to actors during post-production. A light system was also in-place to signal when the cast could take off their masks for filming and when masks would be required for the cast and crew members to wear while set work was being done. Cumberbatch began shooting his scenes in Atlanta by late November, before beginning work on Doctor Strange in the Multiverse of Madness which began filming that month in London. Filming ran for seven-to-eight weeks using the working titles Serenity Now and The November Project, before a break during the 2020 Christmas season.

By December 2020, Alfred Molina was set to reprise his role as Otto Octavius / Doctor Octopus from Sam Raimi's Spider-Man 2 (2004), with Tobey Maguire reprising his role as Peter Parker / Spider-Man from Raimi's Spider-Man film trilogy and Andrew Garfield returning as Peter Parker / Spider-Man from Webb's The Amazing Spider-Man films. A cameo appearance of Maguire and Garfield alongside Holland as their respective Spider-Men had previously been considered for the Sony Pictures Animation film Spider-Man: Into the Spider-Verse (2018), but was cut then because Sony felt at that moment that it would be too risky and confusing. At that time, Collider reported that Maguire and Garfield would appear in the film alongside Kirsten Dunst as Mary Jane Watson from Raimi's Spider-Man film trilogy and Emma Stone as Gwen Stacy from the Amazing Spider-Man films. The first draft of the script included other characters from the Spider-Man and Amazing Spider-Man films, but the writers felt that including too many characters would negatively affect the story. The rumors about returning actors led to speculation and commentary, with Richard Newby of The Hollywood Reporter believing that a crossover-style film could "lessen the impact" of Sony's successful animated Into the Spider-Verse film. His colleague Graeme McMillan felt a "Spider-Verse" crossover would allow Marvel to "clean up some loose ends ... and fulfill some fan dreams in the process", especially if Marvel and Sony's negotiations meant that they wanted to separate Spider-Man from the MCU. /Film Hoai-Tran Bui feared the film was becoming over-crowded and wished that Holland could lead a Spider-Man film without a "bigger A-list star showing him the ropes", while Adam B. Vary of Variety noted that these reports were not confirmed and questioned whether the returning actors would be making more than cameo appearances. Shortly after, Holland denied that Maguire and Garfield would appear in the film. Many of the actors returning from previous Spider-Man films were brought to set in cloaks in order to help prevent their involvements in the film from leaking. Around Christmas 2020, McKenna and Sommers rewrote the introductions of Maguire and Garfield as well as much of the third act in time for those actors to start filming. They had not been able to focus on those scenes earlier because they were busy during filming of much of the first and second acts in the previous months.

Feige confirmed in December 2020 that the film would have connections to Doctor Strange in the Multiverse of Madness. A month later he discussed the fact that the film's title had not yet been announced, acknowledging that it was being referred to by some as Spider-Man 3 and revealing that Marvel was referring to it as Homecoming 3 internally. Cox had shot material for the film by then. An Atlanta set photo indicated that the film would be set during the Christmas season. Filming occurred at Frederick Douglass High School from January 22 to 24. The next month, Holland described it as "the most ambitious standalone superhero" film, and again denied the rumors that Maguire and Garfield would appear. At the end of February, the film's title was revealed to be Spider-Man: No Way Home, continuing the naming convention of the past two films of featuring "home" in the title. Filming took place at Midtown High School from March 19 to 21. The Atlanta Public Schools system had stopped allowing buildings in the district for use as filming locations because of the COVID-19 pandemic, but gave this film an exception since both the Frederick Douglass and Midtown schools were previously used as filming locations in Spider-Man: Homecoming. Hannibal Buress was revealed to be reprising his role as gym teacher Coach Wilson, with Buress releasing a music video in August 2021 revealing that he had filmed scenes in Atlanta. Holland said No Way Home had more "visceral" fight sequences than the previous two films, with more hand-to-hand combat. Filming wrapped on March 26, 2021.

Post-production 

In April 2021, Molina confirmed that he was appearing in the film, explaining that he had been told not to talk about his role in the film during production but he realized that his appearance had been widely rumored and reported on. Later that month, J. B. Smoove revealed that he was returning as Julius Dell from Far From Home, while Cox stated that he was not involved with the film. In early May, Garfield denied that he had been asked to appear in the film, but later said "never say never", while Angourie Rice was revealed to be returning as Betty Brant. Later that month, Stone denied her involvement in the film.

Sony Pictures Group President Sanford Panitch acknowledged in May that there had been confusion and frustration from fans regarding the relationship between the SSU and the MCU, but stated that there was a plan to clarify this. He believed it was already "getting a little more clear for people [as to] where we're headed" at that time and added that the release of No Way Home would reveal more of this plan. Vary commented that the apparent introduction of multiverse elements in No Way Home could be what would allow Holland to appear in both the MCU and the SSU. The official trailer for No Way Home confirmed the involvements of Jon Favreau as Harold "Happy" Hogan and Benedict Wong as Wong, reprising their roles from past MCU films, as well as J. K. Simmons as J. Jonah Jameson from Far From Home (Simmons previously played a different version of the character in the Raimi trilogy as well). It was also confirmed that the characters Electro and Green Goblin would appear in the film, with the implication that this incarnation of Green Goblin would be Willem Dafoe's version from the Raimi films. In September 2021, Garfield again denied he was in the film, saying, "No matter what I say... it's either going to be really disappointing for people or it's going to be really exciting". Garfield later described his denials as "rather stressful but also weirdly enjoyable".

In early October, many commentators expected Tom Hardy to reprise his roles as Eddie Brock and Venom from Venom (2018) and Venom: Let There Be Carnage (2021), after the Let There Be Carnage mid-credits scene showed the characters being transported from their universe (the SSU) to the MCU. Feige said there was a lot of coordination between the Let There Be Carnage and No Way Home teams to create the scene, which was directed by Watts during the production of No Way Home. Hardy ultimately appeared as Brock in the film's mid-credits scene, though there had been discussions about integrating him into the film's final battle. Later that month, Empire issue on No Way Home stated that the film would include the returns of Doctor Octopus, Electro, Dafoe's Green Goblin, Thomas Haden Church's Flint Marko / Sandman from Raimi's Spider-Man 3 (2007), and Rhys Ifans's Curt Connors / Lizard from Webb's The Amazing Spider-Man (2012). Watts said these were still unconfirmed rumors and was in "no hurry to confirm or deny appearances" of the characters, while Feige said the rumors were fun for fans but audiences should not expect them all to come true. The film's second trailer confirmed the involvements of Dafoe, Church, and Ifans.

At the beginning of November, Jorge Lendeborg Jr. revealed that he would be reprising his role as Jason Ionello from Homecoming and Far From Home in a similar role to those films that would have "very little to do with the core" story. By the middle of the month, additional photography had been completed for the film. Pascal described No Way Home as "the culmination of the Homecoming trilogy", and Arian Moayed revealed that he had a role in the film. Dunst said she was not in the film, but would "never say no" to reprising her role of Mary Jane Watson. A teaser trailer for Doctor Strange in the Multiverse of Madness was included at the end of the film as a post-credits scene, before being released online shortly after No Way Home theatrical release.

Jeffrey Ford and Leigh Folsom Boyd served as the film's editors. The visual effects were provided by Cinesite, Clear Angle Studios, Crafty Apes, Digital Domain, Folks VFX, Framestore, Luma Pictures, Monsters Aliens Robots Zombies, Mr. X, Perception, Secret Lab, Sony Pictures Imageworks, and SSVFX.

Music 

In November 2020, Homecoming and Far From Home composer Michael Giacchino was confirmed to be returning for No Way Home. The film's score album was released digitally on December 17, 2021, with a track titled "Arachnoverture" released as a single on December 9 and another titled "Exit Through the Lobby" released the following day. Giacchino references themes from previous Spider-Man films by Hans Zimmer, James Horner, Christopher Young, and Danny Elfman, as well as his own themes from Doctor Strange (2016). Regarding the use of these other themes, Giacchino did not want their use to be fan service and finding ways to include them in a "very targeted" way. He and Watts were "very much in alignment in terms of when to use them and when not to use them for their maximum effect".

Marketing 
In May 2020, Sony entered a promotional partnership with Hyundai Motor Group to showcase their new models and technologies in the film; Hyundai later released a commercial, titled "Only Way Home", that was directed by Watts to promote the film and the Ioniq 5 electric-powered SUV (which appears in the film along with the Hyundai Tucson), with Holland and Batalon starring. In late February 2021, Holland, Batalon, and Zendaya released three stills featuring their characters from the film alongside fake logos with the titles Spider-Man: Phone Home, Spider-Man: Home-Wrecker, and Spider-Man: Home Slice, respectively. The film's official title was announced the next day with a video showing Holland, Batalon, and Zendaya leaving Watts's office (where they supposedly received the fake titles). Batalon and Zendaya note that Holland could not be trusted with the actual title since he had "accidentally" revealed the second film's title. The video ends on a whiteboard showing the film's true title, among various other titles featuring the word "home" that were apparently considered. Jennifer Bisset of CNET suggested the fake titles and logos could represent the villains in the film, including Foxx's Electro and Molina's Doctor Octopus, while TheWrap Umberto Gonzalez called them funny "bait-and-switch fakes", and noted the Phone Home title referenced a line from E.T. the Extra-Terrestrial (1982). Gregory Lawrence of Collider felt the Home-Wrecker title could point to the film feeling like a 1990s thriller film, and said the fake titles were a "solid goof" to excite fans. He also compared the stills to the "terrifying/awe-inspiring wonder" of Steven Spielberg films and The Goonies (1985), while Germain Lussier from io9 said they gave off "subtle National Treasure, Indiana Jones vibes". In July 2021, Marvel revealed various toys and figurines for the film, including Funko Pops, Marvel Legends figures, and Lego sets.

At the end of August 2021, when asked about the lack of trailer and official images or descriptions for the film, Feige stated that the film was not being "any more or less secret than any of our other projects" and reaffirmed that a trailer would be released before the film's premiere in theaters. Though Sony handles the marketing for the film, their marketing team is in coordination with Disney's to ensure each knows when the other is releasing MCU-related content so it is a "win-win for everybody". On August 22, an apparent leak of the first trailer was shared on social media, which The Hollywood Reporter deemed "legitimate" after Sony worked to have various copies of the trailer taken down. Adam Chitwood at Collider noted the built up online "fervor" surrounding the trailer and felt that it would not be able to "live up to the hype fans have built up in their minds". Chitwood continued that the other 2021 film releases from Marvel Studios had not seen a similar level of demand as No Way Home, pointing out that all of the rumored castings had positioned the film to be a "once-in-a-lifetime moviegoing experience" if they were accurate. He also wondered if Sony was wary of committing marketing that noted the film's December 2021 release date amid the resurgence of the COVID-19 Delta variant.

The film's teaser trailer was officially released on August 23 during Sony's CinemaCon 2021 panel. Entertainment Weekly Devan Coggan noted that the trailer confirmed the multiverse's role in the film, including elements from the Raimi and Webb films, while Ethan Anderton from /Film called the trailer "nothing short of thrilling" since it confirmed many of the previous rumors about the film. Austen Goslin at Polygon conversely felt much of what had been rumored did not get revealed in the trailer, feeling that the rumors were either false or Marvel was still intending to keep them a secret. Anderton's colleague Joshua Meyer called the trailer "a doozy... packed with jaw-dropping moments" and noted how the film would be adapting the "One More Day" comic book storyline; Newby had previously noted the apparent adaption of "One More Day" and "One Moment in Time" storylines following the reveal of Cumberbatch's casting. Many commentators noted the possible teases of Spider-Man villains Sandman and the Lizard in the trailer as an indication of the Sinister Six forming in the film. Vinnie Mancuso at Collider was excited to see the return of Molina and the potential for Dafoe's involvement, but called it a "cheap pop" since it was doing "a disservice to the stories you're trying to tell in the present by reminding the audience how much better things used to be". He also felt the trailer played into "Marvel's ongoing reluctance to let Tom Holland's Spider-Man star in his own Spider-Man movies" since the trailer gave Parker "zero memorable moments" amongst all of its elements. The trailer had 355.5million global views in its first 24 hours, becoming the most viewed trailer in that time period. This surpassed the record of Avengers: Endgame (289million views) and more than doubled the views for the Spider-Man: Far From Home trailer (135 million). It also generated the largest 24-hour social media conversation volume of all-time globally with 4.5 million mentions, made up of 2.91 million in the United States, and 1.5 million internationally; these both exceeded Avengers: Endgame mentions (1.94 million in the United States, 1.38 million internationally).

The second official trailer premiered at a fan screening at the Regal Sherman Oaks theater in Los Angeles on November 16, 2021. Goslin felt the trailer "reveals the full extent of Marvel's Spider-Man multiverse", while his colleague Matt Patches noted the missing appearance of Maguire's or Garfield's Spider-Man in the trailer but felt that it was "entirely possible the actors appear in No Way Home". Jason Robbins of Collider was disappointed by the trailer, saying it was "what we expected, but less", since it just showed the returning villains and had no confirmation of Maguire or Garfield or "further insight into the multiverse". Some commentators said parts of the trailer appeared as though Maguire and Garfield had been edited out of the footage, such as a shot in which the Lizard appears to be struck by an invisible force. On November 24, Sony began releasing several videos on TikTok as part of their The Daily Bugle viral marketing campaign featuring Simmons and Rice. In December 2021, the first minute of the film premiered exclusively on Late Night with Seth Meyers, while a newsstand for The Daily Bugle was set up in New York City in partnership with Liberty Mutual to promote the film. Other marketing partners include the video games Fortnite and PUBG Mobile, which featured special in-game Spider-Man themed props and costumes, Asus, whose Republic of Gamers (ROG) laptop is used by Ned in the film, Xiaomi, iQOO, Continental AG, and Tampico Beverages. The film had a total promotional marketing value of $202 million.

Release

Theatrical 
Spider-Man: No Way Home had its world premiere at Fox Village Theatre in Los Angeles on December 13, 2021. The film was released in the United Kingdom and Ireland on December 15, and in the United States on December 17, where it opened in 4,325 theaters including in IMAX and other premium large formats. It was previously set for release on July 16, 2021, but was pushed back to November 5, before it was further shifted to the December 2021 date due to the COVID-19 pandemic. It is part of Phase Four of the MCU.

In August 2021, Sony and CJ 4DPlex announced a deal to release 15 of Sony's films over three years in the ScreenX format, including No Way Home. In November 2021, the film was reported to be getting a theatrical release in China, making it the first Phase Four film to do so as Black Widow, Shang-Chi and the Legend of the Ten Rings, and Eternals were not released in the country, though , there is no release date, in part because of diplomatic tensions between China and the United States, including the U.S. diplomatic boycott of the 2022 Beijing Winter Olympics. Chinese authorities had requested for the Statue of Liberty to be removed from the film, which Sony refused.

The More Fun Stuff Version 

An extended cut of the film, subtitled The More Fun Stuff Version, was announced in June 2022. The re-release celebrates 60 years of Spider-Man in comics and 20 years of Spider-Man in film, and features approximately 13 minutes of additional and deleted scenes. The additions include: an introduction by Holland, Maguire, and Garfield; additional scenes of Parker and May being interrogated by the Department of Damage Control; the scene with Holland's brother Harry as a thief that was cut from the original release; Daily Bugle reports of Parker's first day back at school and the arrivals of Dillon and Marko; additional scenes of Parker at school; Brant interviewing Parker, his teachers, and his classmates; additional scenes in the basement of the New York Sanctum; a scene featuring May, Parker, and the villains in an elevator while on the way to Hogan's apartment; an additional scene with Murdock and Hogan; additional scenes of the three Parkers; and a new post-credits scene, replacing the Doctor Strange in the Multiverse of Madness teaser trailer, which showcases the effects of Strange's second spell.

The More Fun Stuff Version was released in theaters beginning August 31, 2022, in Indonesia, followed by the United States and Canada, among other countries, on September 1, and later in a number of other markets through October 6. The poster for the extended cut was considered an improvement from the original release's marketing, since it was able to feature all of the characters previously kept a secret leading up to the film's release. Shrishty Mishra at Collider said it was an "Avengers-style poster [with] a perfect blend of the multiverse feels, combined with the 'Where's Waldo' effect". Anthony Lund of MovieWeb called it an "epic poster that [the fans] have been calling out for". ComicBook.coms Russ Burlingame said the poster was what "we've all been waiting for" and "a big change in the way [Sony] initially promoted the movie" since they "continued to play coy" on the cameos after the film had released.

Home media 

Spider-Man: No Way Home was released by Sony Pictures Home Entertainment on digital on March 15, 2022, and on Ultra HD Blu-ray, Blu-ray, and DVD on April 12, 2022. Digitally, the film was also available in a three-film bundle including all of Marvel Studios' Spider-Man films, as well as an eight-film bundle including Holland, Maguire, and Garfield's films. Sony moved the digital release up to March 15 from March 22, 2022, following Blu-ray versions of the film being leaked to torrent sites. The home media includes a gag reel and various behind-the-scenes featurettes, including two roundtable discussions: one with Dafoe, Molina, and Foxx, and another with Holland, Maguire, and Garfield. It has the most pre-release digital purchases on Vudu, surpassing the purchases for Avengers: Endgame. To announce the home media release dates, Sony and the film's social media accounts posted a photo of Holland, Maguire, and Garfield recreating a popular meme from the 1967 Spider-Man television series of multiple Spider-Men pointing at one another; the tweets of the image garnered more than 10,000 retweets within minutes of being posted. Within its first week of release, the film sold over 2.1 million digital units in the United States, equalling $42 million; this was a record for a film's first week available on digital release. It was also the highest-selling film on physical media for 2022 in the US according to The NPD Group.

The film was released on Starz following its theatrical and home media releases, the last film released by Sony with an exclusive limited streaming video on demand (SVOD) release on Starz. Following films would be released on Netflix after their theatrical and home media releases, through 2026. Additionally, Sony signed a deal with Disney in April 2021 giving the latter access to Sony's legacy content, including past Spider-Man films and Marvel content in the SSU, to stream on Disney+ and Hulu and appear on Disney's linear television networks. Disney's access to Sony's titles to be released from 2022 through 2026 would come following their availability on Netflix. In February 2022, Sony expanded their pre-existing deal with WarnerMedia for making their films available on HBO Max and HBO across Central and Eastern Europe, which included No Way Home. The More Fun Stuff Version was released by Sony Pictures Home Entertainment on digital on October 18, 2022 as Spider-Man: No Way Home – Extended Cut, when it also began streaming on Starz.

Reception

Box office 
Spider-Man: No Way Home grossed $814.1million in the United States and Canada, and $1.108billion in other territories for a worldwide total of $1.922billion. It is the highest-grossing film of 2021, the seventh-highest-grossing film of all time, the third-highest-grossing film in the United States and Canada, the highest-grossing Spider-Man film, and the highest-grossing film released by Sony. No Way Home is also the first film since Star Wars: The Rise of Skywalker (2019) to gross over $1billion, becoming the third-fastest to reach that milestone and the first to do so during the COVID-19 pandemic. It surpassed Jumanji: Welcome to the Jungle (2017) to become Sony Pictures' highest-grossing film in North America. Based on a final projected worldwide gross of $1.75 billion (a figure that was surpassed), Deadline Hollywood estimated the film's final net profit at $610million, accounting for production budgets, marketing, talent participations, and other costs versus box office grosses and home media revenues. It returned the global revenue of Cineworld, the world's second-largest cinema operator, to 88% of 2019 levels.

In the United States and Canada, Spider-Man: No Way Home earned $121.85million (which included $50million from its Thursday night previews) on its opening day, becoming the second-highest opening film after Avengers: Endgame ($157.4million) and the highest-opening film for a December release. In its opening weekend, it grossed $260million, surpassing Avengers: Infinity War ($257.7million) to become the second-highest domestic box office opening of all time. , an estimated 54.4million people have seen Spider-Man: No Way Home in theaters in the United States and Canada. The film remained at the top of the box office for three additional weekends until it was dethroned in its fifth weekend by Scream. In its sixth weekend of release, Spider-Man: No Way Home reclaimed the top spot at the box office. The film once again held onto the number one spot in its seventh weekend of release. In March 2022, the film surpassed $800 million in the United States and Canada, becoming the third film to do so after Star Wars: The Force Awakens (2015) and Avengers: Endgame. Comscore Senior Media Analyst Paul Dergarabedian called the film "arguably the most important movie to the movie theater industry ever", as it helped show the viability of the movie theater industry and the benefit of theatrical release windows while the industry recovered from the COVID-19 pandemic. The film dropped to the 11th spot on its 15th weekend. Spider-Man: No Way Home returned to first place at the box office, earning $1.8 million on the first day of the release of The More Fun Stuff Version, and went on to finish third with $6.5 million over the four-day Labor Day weekend, finishing behind Top Gun: Maverick and Bullet Train. It was the highest opening weekend box office gross for a re-released MCU film, surpassing Avengers: Endgame ($5.5 million) and Spider-Man: Far From Home ($4 million).

Spider-Man: No Way Home earned $43.6million from 15 markets on its opening day, with Sony holding the best opening-day record in South Korea, the United Kingdom, Mexico, Italy, and Taiwan. In South Korea, the film grossed $5.28million on its opening day, thereby beating Spider-Man: Far From Homes opening day in the country by over 11% and the biggest day-one figure for any film during the pandemic. In the United Kingdom, the film beat No Time to Dies opening box office record at £7.6million ($10.1million). In its five-day opening weekend, the film grossed $340.8million from 60 markets. In Latin America as of January 16, 2022, it became the all-time highest-grossing film in Mexico, and the second all-time highest in Brazil, Central America and Ecuador. , the film's largest markets are the United Kingdom ($127.3million), Mexico ($76.2million), Australia ($67.9million), France ($65.2million), and South Korea ($63.1million).

Pre-sale ticket records 
Tickets went on sale the midnight of November 29, 2021, with several ticket websites such as Fandango and AMC Theatres crashing due to the high influx of users attempting to purchase tickets. Ticket sales on Fandango surpassed those for Black Widow in just two hours, and by the end of the day it became the best first-day advance ticket sale since Endgame, while also surpassing the 24-hour ticket sales of Avengers: Infinity War, Star Wars: The Last Jedi (2017), Spider-Man: Far From Home, Star Wars: The Rise of Skywalker and Rogue One (2016). No Way Home had second-highest one-day ticket sales on AMC, with CEO Adam Aron attributing this to Spider-Man-themed non-fungible tokens (NFTs).

The film also set records in Mexico with $7million in the first-day ticket sale, which was 40% above Endgame. In the United Kingdom, the film outsold No Time to Die three times in the same twelve-day span before their release, while Brazil's ticket sale was 5% above Endgame at the same point. The film also passed the presale records of The Rise of Skywalker in Poland and No Time to Die in Portugal. Other markets with the best presale records include Spain, Brazil, and Central America.

Critical response 
The site's critical consensus reads: "A bigger, bolder Spider-Man sequel, No Way Home expands the franchise's scope and stakes without losing sight of its humor and heart." On Metacritic, the film has a weighted average score of 71 out of 100, based on 60 critics, indicating "generally favorable reviews". Audiences polled by CinemaScore gave the film a rare "A+" grade on an A+ to F scale, the first live-action Spider-Man film and the fourth MCU film overall to earn the score after The Avengers (2012), Black Panther (2018), and Avengers: Endgame. PostTrak reported 96% of audience members gave it a positive score, with 91% saying they would definitely recommend it.

Amelia Emberwing of IGN gave the film 8 out of 10, stating that its "impact on the universe as a whole, as well as the overall emotional beats, all feel earned" while praising the performances of Dafoe, Molina, and Foxx. Pete Hammond of Deadline Hollywood praised Watts's direction and wrote, "Holland, Zendaya, and Batalon are a priceless trio, and the various villains and 'others' who pop in and out make this pure movie fun of the highest order. Fans will be in heaven". Peter Debruge of Variety praised Garfield's and Maguire's performances and felt the film "provides enough resolution for the past two decades of Spider-Man adventures that audiences who've tuned out along the way will be rewarded for giving this one a shot". Writing for Den of Geek, Don Kaye gave the film 4 out of 5 stars, for its action sequences, performances and chemistry of the cast, stating that "No Way Home channels the entire spectrum of Spider-Man movies while setting the character on a course all his own at last". Jennifer Bisset of CNET praised the action sequences, performances, and story, writing: "A Russo Brothers influence can almost be felt ushering Holland's third Spider-Man movie into new, weightier territory. If the character is to become the next Tony Stark, this is the way to etch a few more scars into a more interesting hero's facade. If you came for the biggest movie of the year, you'll definitely leave satisfied".

Kevin Maher of The Times gave the film 4 out of 5 stars, saying that it was "As satisfying to watch as it is perilous to discuss", and described it as "a dynamite blast of smarty-pants postmodernism that never once abandons its emotional core." Benjamin Lee of The Guardian gave the film 3 out of 5 stars, praising Watts for "bringing back numerous baddies from the previous Spider-Man universes, delivering a propulsive, slickly choreographed adventure that will appease a broad fanbase this Christmas" but feeling that the script "lacks the expected fizz, that sense of shaggy fun struggling to break through a more robotic plot". Kate Erbland of IndieWire gave the film a "B−", feeling that Watts's work was "satisfying, emotional, and occasionally unsteady". She found that the script spent "far too long dwelling on the machinations of people and plans we already know, throwing in some awkward misdirection and simply delaying the inevitable". The Hollywood Reporters John DeFore felt that the inclusion of "multiversal mayhem" addressed the "Iron Man-ification of the character" that made Holland-centric films "least fun".

CNN'''s Brian Lowry praised the humor and wrote, "What's already apparent, though, is that this movie was conceived to be savored and enjoyed. And in what has become an increasingly elusive phenomenon, that will include whoops and hollers from appreciative fans in theaters, where Spider-Man will first reveal its secrets, and then, more than likely, shows off its legs." Richard Roeper of Chicago Sun-Times gave the film 3 out of 4 and praised the performances of Holland and Zendaya, writing: "There's nothing new or particularly memorable about the serviceable CGI and practical effects, but we remain invested in the outcome in large part because Holland remains the best of the cinematic Spider-Men, while Zendaya lends heart and smarts and warmth to every moment she's onscreen. We continue to root for these two to make it, even if the multiverse isn't always on their side." In contrast, Bilge Ebiri of Vulture called the film "aggressively mediocre", but praised Dafoe – who he said "once again gets to have some modest fun with his character's divided self" – and Garfield, calling him a "genuine delight" and naming his the film's best performance.

 Accolades No Way Home was nominated for an Academy Award, three Visual Effects Society awards (winning one), a Costume Designers Guild Award, a Golden Reel Award, three Nickelodeon Kids' Choice Awards (winning all), five Critics' Choice Super Awards (winning three), and nine Saturn Awards (winning one), among others. The film was disqualified from consideration for the 75th British Academy Film Awards because it was not made available on BAFTA's streaming service, reportedly due to Sony being concerned about piracy. As part of the ceremony's "Oscars Fan Favorite" contest, the three Spider-Men teaming up was one of the five finalists for Oscars Cheer Moment, and the film was the favorite to win the "Fan Favorite" film contest according to a Morning Consult survey. It ended up finishing second and fourth, respectively.

 Future 
By August 2019, a fourth film in the franchise was in development alongside No Way Home. In February 2021, Holland said No Way Home was the final film under his contract but he hoped to continue playing Spider-Man in the future if asked. That October, Holland said No Way Home was being treated as "the end of a franchise" that began with Homecoming, with any additional solo films featuring the MCU Spider-Man characters to be different from the first trilogy of films and feature a tonal change. A month later, Holland said he was unsure if he should continue making Spider-Man films and felt he would have "done something wrong" if he was still portraying the character in his thirties. He expressed interest in a film focusing on the Miles Morales version of Spider-Man instead. Despite this, Pascal hoped to continue working with Holland on future Spider-Man films. Later in November, Pascal said there were plans for another trilogy of Spider-Man films starring Holland, with work on the first of those about to begin, though Sony did not yet have official plans for further MCU Spider-Man films.

Feige confirmed in December that he and Pascal, along with Sony and Disney, were actively beginning to develop the story for the next Spider-Man film following Parker's "momentous decision" in No Way Home. He promised that the partnership between Sony and Disney would not break down again as it did during the development of No Way Home. In April 2022, following Watts' exit as director of Marvel Studios' Fantastic Four in order to take a break from blockbuster films, Deadline Hollywood reported that Sony still expected Watts (along with Holland and Zendaya) to eventually return for the next MCU Spider-Man'' film. Feige said in February 2023 that they had a story for the film with "big ideas" and that writers had begun work on it.

Notes

References

External links 

 
  at Marvel.com
 
 Official screenplay (archive)

2020s American films
2020s coming-of-age films
2020s English-language films
2020s fantasy action films
2020s superhero films
2021 science fiction action films
4DX films
Action crossover films
American coming-of-age films
American crossover films
American fantasy action films
American films about revenge
American science fiction action films
American sequel films
American superhero films
Columbia Pictures films
Fantasy crossover films
Films about altered memories
Films about magic
Films about parallel universes
Films directed by Jon Watts
Films postponed due to the COVID-19 pandemic
Films produced by Amy Pascal
Films scored by Michael Giacchino
Films set in 2024
Films set in New York City
Films shot at Trilith Studios
Films shot in Atlanta
Films shot in New York City
Films with screenplays by Chris McKenna
Films with screenplays by Erik Sommers
Grand Canyon in fiction
Green Goblin
IMAX films
Marvel Cinematic Universe: Phase Four films
Science fiction crossover films
ScreenX films
Spider-Man (2017 film series)
Spider-Man films
Statue of Liberty in fiction
Superhero crossover films
Teen superhero films